The Boones Mill Depot is a historic railroad station building at Digby Greene Road and Depot Drive in Boones Mill, Virginia.  It is a single-story wood-frame structure, covered with a gabled roof whose eaves extend well beyond the building.  Its exterior is clad in vertical board-and-batten siding.  The building is divided functionally into a freight depot and passenger area, with the station office in between.  The office area includes a projecting bay on the track side of the building, topped by a small gable.  The station was built in 1892 for the Norfolk Southern Railway, and was taken out of service in 1970.  It was acquired by the town in 2014.

The depot was listed on the National Register of Historic Places in 2017.

See also
National Register of Historic Places listings in Franklin County, Virginia

References

Railway stations on the National Register of Historic Places in Virginia
Railway stations in the United States opened in 1892
National Register of Historic Places in Franklin County, Virginia